Dominique Rhymes (born June 20, 1993) is an American professional football wide receiver who is currently a member of the BC Lions of the Canadian Football League (CFL)  He has also been a member of the Ottawa Redblacks. He played three seasons of  college football for Florida International.

Professional career

Ottawa Redblacks 
Rhymes signed with the Ottawa Redblacks of the Canadian Football League (CFL) on May 29, 2017. He saw only limited action in his first two seasons with the Redblacks, catching 37 passes for 522 yards with one touchdown. His third year in the league proved to be a breakout season for Rhymes as he led the Redblacks in receptions (65), receiving yards (1,056) and receiving touchdowns (5). Following the 2019 season Rhymes and the Redblacks were unable to come to an agreement for a new contract and he became a free agent on February 11, 2020.

BC Lions 
On February 21, 2020, Rhymes signed with the B.C. Lions (CFL). He signed a one-year contract extension with the team on December 14, 2020. In two seasons with the Lions Rhymes played in 26 games catching 113 passes for 1812 yards with 12 touchdowns. At the end of the 2022 season he was named a CFL All-Star after finishing third in receptions (85), and second in receiving yards (1,401) and touchdowns (11). On February 12, 2023, he requested a trade, seeking a larger salary contract extension elsewhere. Nevertheless, the following day on February 13, Rhymes and the Lions agreed to a two-year contract extension keeping him with the club through the 2024 season.

References

External links
CFL.ca bio
BC Lions bio

1993 births
Living people
Canadian football wide receivers
Players of American football from Miami
Murray State Racers football players
Ottawa Redblacks players
Players of Canadian football from Miami